Lambda is General Motors full-size or mid-size 3-row crossover SUV automobile platform.  It is largely derived from the GM Epsilon platform, which underlies the Chevrolet Malibu sedan and similar models.

The Buick Enclave concept car was previewed at the 2006 North American International Auto Show, and the Saturn Outlook was shown at the 2006 New York Auto Show. The 2007 Outlook and GMC Acadia went into production in late 2006, followed by the 2008 Enclave in mid-2007, and the 2009 Chevrolet Traverse in mid-2008.

Lambda vehicles feature easily accessible three-row seating.  They were supplied with the LY7 3.6-liter V6.  Starting with the 2009 model year all Lambda vehicles have GM LLT 3.6-liter gasoline direct injection engine for improved fuel efficiency, horsepower and torque.  With the cancellation of GM's next-generation DOHC V8, there would be no V8 powertrain for the Lambda platform. The platform has been designed for front and all-wheel drive applications.

Lambda vehicles are produced in the new Lansing Delta Township Assembly plant near Lansing, Michigan. The Traverse began production in September 2008 at a retooled Spring Hill Assembly Plant in Tennessee, but production was later moved to Lansing.  GM discontinued the Outlook after the 2010 model year along with the entire Saturn brand.

Meanwhile, GM announced a second generation of its GMC Acadia for the 2013 model year, taking the bodyshell of the discontinued Saturn Outlook, while at the same time, GM would refresh its Buick Enclave & Chevrolet Traverse vehicles.

Minivans
GM was considering replacing the U-body minivans with new minivans using the Lambda platform for the 2009 model year, but due to the decline of minivan sales the plan was cancelled.

Vehicles
Vehicles based on this platform:
 2007–2010 Saturn Outlook
 2007–2016 GMC Acadia
 2008–2017 Buick Enclave
 2009–2017 Chevrolet Traverse

Sales

See also
List of General Motors platforms

References
 
 

Lambda